Protectorate, also known as Duhu Fu, was a type of administrative division of the Chinese Empire, especially during the Han and Tang dynasties, established in frontier regions. During the Han and Tang dynasties, a protectorate was the highest government agency in frontier areas and was directly responsible to the imperial court. The protectorate governor was called duhu (literally "protectore city protector"), who needed to take charge in military operations when necessary, and provide instructions to minority tribes and small dependent states within the region. This is different from the Jiedushi (military commissioner) position. During rebellion and wartime, the two position can be held by the same person.

Sometimes, a protectorate had subdivisions named commanderies, or Dudu Fu. The first protectorate was the Protectorate of the Western Regions established in 60 BCE during Emperor Xuan's reign. It controlled the majority of Tarim Basin and some other parts of Central Asia after the Han dynasty defeated Xiongnu.

Notable protectorates 
Notable protectorates in Chinese history include:
Han dynasty:
Protectorate of the Western Regions
Tang dynasty:
Anxi Protectorate
Anbei Protectorate
Andong Protectorate
Annan Protectorate
Beiting Protectorate
Chanyu Protectorate
Song dynasty:
Longyou Protectorate
Yuan dynasty:
Goryeo (1270–1356)
Dongnyeong Prefectures
Ssangseong Prefectures
Tamna Prefectures

See also
 Commandery (China)

References 

History of Imperial China
Subdivisions of Korea
Former client states